"You Know Me" is the second official single from British singer-songwriter Robbie Williams' eighth studio album Reality Killed the Video Star. The song was released on 4 December 2009. It is based on an original song "Voilà" written by French artist Françoise Hardy. Williams performed the song during his BBC Electric Proms concert on 20 October 2009. Ken Bruce premiered the song on BBC Radio 2 during his show.

Critical reception
UK website Digital Spy gave the song four stars (out of five) commenting that: "'You Know Me', a single whose very title seems to be cosying up to all those fans he's neglected in recent years – just the sort of fans who are likely to enjoy this tune. Borrowing sufficiently from Françoise Hardy's 'Voila' to earn the chanteuse a co-writing credit, it's a classic Robbie ballad with lashings of strings, 'shoo-ba-ba' backing vocals and a lovely, timeless-sounding chorus melody."

Music video
The music video for the song was released on Williams' official website on 6 November 2009. In the video Robbie Williams falls asleep and wakes up dressed as a rabbit in a waistcoat, exploring a fantasy world that seems to be based on Alice in Wonderland. After he finishes exploring the fantasy world he dances with a group of women also dressed as rabbits; however, this time he is wearing make-up to complete his transformation. The video was directed by Phil & Olly (also known as Diamond Dogs) and filmed at Shepperton Studios.

Track listing
UK CD single
 "You Know Me" – 4:21
 "Bodies" (Aeroplane Remix) – 6:42

Digital EP
 "You Know Me" – 4:21
 "You Know Me" (The Count & Sinden Remix) – 4:58
 "You Know Me" (The Count & Sinden Dubble Bubble Remix) – 4:15

Chart performance

Year-end charts

Certifications and sales

Release history

References

External links
 RobbieWilliams.com – Robbie Williams official website

2009 singles
Robbie Williams songs
Song recordings produced by Trevor Horn
2009 songs
EMI Records singles